Valerio Mastrantonio (born 22 June 1999) is an Italian football player. He plays for Cittadella.

Club career
He started playing on the Under-19 level for Frosinone. In November 2017, he was called up twice to their senior squad for Serie B games, but remained on the bench. He spent the first two seasons of his senior career on loan at the Serie D club Monterosi.

On 13 August 2020, he joined Serie B club Cittadella. He made his Serie B debut for Cittadella on 20 October 2020 in a game against Pordenone. He substituted Mario Gargiulo in added time.

References

External links
 

1999 births
Footballers from Rome
Living people
Italian footballers
Association football midfielders
Frosinone Calcio players
A.S. Cittadella players
Serie B players
Serie D players